Khaneqah-e Olya or Khanqah-e Olya may refer to:
 Khaneqah-e Olya, Ardabil
 Khaneqah-e Olya, Kermanshah
 Khaneqah-e Olya, Markazi